This is a list of places in the Wye Valley, which is on the border between England and Wales.

West side

The following places are on the west side of the valley and are listed in order from south to north.

 Chepstow
 Wynd Cliff
 Tintern
 Bargain Wood
 Cleddon Bog
 Llandogo
 Whitebrook
 Penallt
 Monmouth
 Symonds Yat West
 Whitchurch
 Goodrich
 Hoarwithy
 Holme Lacy

East side

The following places are on the east side of the valley and are listed in order from south to north.

 Beachley
 Tidenham Chase
 Brockweir
 Hewelsfield
 Redbrook
 Symonds Yat East
 Ross-on-Wye
 King's Caple
 Brockhampton
 Fownhope
 Mordiford

River Wye